Double Dagger is the eponymous debut full length by Baltimore punk rock band Double Dagger.  It features original drummer Brian Dubin, and is markedly more garage rock in feel than the group's more recent work.

Track listing
 "I Was So Bored, I Wanted To Hang Myself On The Dance Floor" – 1:48 
 "Corporate Logo Preservation Society" – 2:31 
 "Pound Of Flesh" – 1:57
 "Punk Rock Vs. Swiss Modernism" – 2:39
 "CMYK" – 2:20
 "My Dad Has A Theory That The Internet Is The Roman Coliseum Of Our Times" – 2:39
 "Command+X Command+Y" – 2:19
 "Comic Book Lettering" – 2:01
 "You're Getting Paid To Make My Life Harder" – 2:17
 "Lorem Ipsum" – 2:28

Personnel 
 Nolen Strals – vocals
 Bruce Willen – bass
 Brian Dubin – drums

References

2003 debut albums
Double Dagger (band) albums